Citizens National Bank of Latrobe, also known as Mellon National Bank Building, is a historic bank building located at Latrobe, Westmoreland County, Pennsylvania.  It was designed by architect Batholomew & Smith and built in 1926.  It is a six-story, "L"-shaped, steel frame and masonry building in the Italian Renaissance Revival style. It has a brick and granite exterior and a flat roof.  It is the tallest building in Latrobe.

It was added to the National Register of Historic Places in 2002.

Gallery

References

Bank buildings on the National Register of Historic Places in Pennsylvania
Renaissance Revival architecture in Pennsylvania
Commercial buildings completed in 1926
Buildings and structures in Westmoreland County, Pennsylvania
Latrobe, Pennsylvania
National Register of Historic Places in Westmoreland County, Pennsylvania